The 1992 Canal Plus European Challenge was a professional invitational snooker tournament, which took place in March 1992 at the Happy European Sports & Business Centre in Waregem, Belgium.

Stephen Hendry won the tournament beating Joe Johnson 4–0 in the final.

Main draw

References

European Challenge
1992 in snooker
1992 in Belgian sport